The Monroe Subdivision is a railroad line owned by CSX Transportation in the U.S. states of North Carolina and South Carolina. The line runs from Pee Dee, North Carolina, to Abbeville, South Carolina, for a total of 177 miles. At its north end the line continues south from the Hamlet Terminal Subdivision and at its south end it continues south as the Abbeville Subdivision of the Atlanta Division.

See also
 List of CSX Transportation lines

References

CSX Transportation lines
Rail infrastructure in South Carolina
Rail infrastructure in North Carolina